Yager Stadium at Moore Bowl is a sport stadium in Topeka, Kansas. The facility is primarily used by Washburn University for college football and men's and women's soccer teams. The stadium currently hosts the Kansas State High School Activities Association Class 6A state championship game.

Previously just called the Moore Bowl, the stadium was re-dedicated in 2002 and named for former Washburn player Gary Yager at the request of an anonymous donor.

References

External links
 Yager Stadium official site

College football venues
College soccer venues in the United States
Washburn Ichabods football
American football venues in Kansas
Sports venues in Kansas